The Dragon Trophy is an annual international figure skating competition. It is typically held in February in Ljubljana, Slovenia. Medals may be awarded in men's and ladies' singles on the senior, junior, and advanced novice levels. Senior events were added in 2012.

Senior medalists

Men

Women

Junior medalists

Men

Women

Advanced novice medalists

Men

Women

References

External links 
 History of Dragon Trophy
 International Skating Union

Figure skating competitions
International figure skating competitions hosted by Slovenia